Amphisbaena absaberi is a worm lizard species in the family Amphisbaenidae. It is endemic to Brazil.

References

absaberi
Reptiles described in 2001
Endemic fauna of Brazil
Reptiles of Brazil
Taxa named by Christine Strüssman
Taxa named by Marcos André de Carvalho